The Scoundrel is a 1935 drama film directed by Ben Hecht and Charles MacArthur, and starring Noël Coward, Julie Haydon, Stanley Ridges, Rosita Moreno and Lionel Stander. It was Coward's film debut, aside from a bit role in a silent film. It deals with supernatural redemption in a way rather similar to Ferenc Molnár's  Liliom, and drew inspiration from the life of publisher Horace Liveright, who had died in September 1933.

Plot
Anthony Mallare (Noël Coward) is a publisher who (it appears) wishes to ruin the life of every person he comes in contact with. Every sentence he says is like a poisoned dart aimed for the greatest damage, and delivered in cold lifeless tones. He is under no illusion regarding his own personality, remarking to his staff at large that he has found the perfect woman—one as empty as he is: "I must marry her ... it would be like two empty paper bags belabouring one another". He finally manages to completely destroy the career and life of an aspiring young author (Stanley Ridges) and his girlfriend (Julie Haydon), who curses him with the hope that he will die friendless. Shortly afterwards he is killed when his plane crashes into the ocean—Haydon's character, upon hearing of the tragedy, remarks, "I've just found out there IS a God!"

Faced with the prospect of damnation he is allowed to go back to earth to find one person who will mourn for him—which person turns out to be Haydon. (Those around him are astonished to see him apparently alive and back at work, but gradually become aware that something supernatural is afoot.)

Cast
Noël Coward as Anthony Mallare 
Julie Haydon as Cora Moore
Stanley Ridges as Paul Decker
Martha Sleeper as Julia Vivian
Ernest Cossart as Jimmy Clay
Rosita Moreno as Carlotta
Eduardo Ciannelli as Maurice Stern
Lionel Stander as Rothenstien
O. Z. Whitehead as Calhoun
Harry Davenport as Slezack 
Burgess Meredith as Bum (uncredited)

Reception
The Scoundrel won the 1935 Academy Award for Best Original Story by writing team Hecht and MacArthur. It is an early role for Lionel Stander (his first year in pictures) and is a rare film role for columnist Alexander Woollcott typecast as an acid-tongued writer.

The Scoundrel had its copyright renewed in 1962 (R297413 25 Jun 62) and for several years has been available via unauthorized VHS and DVD copies. In March 2008, the Noël Coward Society screened a 16mm copy of the film at the Paley Center for Media in New York City. (Renewal notice in Minus and Hale, Film Superlist, vol. 8, p. 747)

External links

1935 films
1935 drama films
Film noir
American black-and-white films
Films directed by Ben Hecht
Films scored by George Antheil
Films that won the Academy Award for Best Story
American drama films
Films with screenplays by Ben Hecht
Films with screenplays by Charles MacArthur
1930s English-language films
1930s American films